Peter James Smith (born 26 November 1985) is a former English professional footballer who played as a goalkeeper.

Career statistics

Club

Notes

References

External links
 Yau Yee Football League profile

Living people
1985 births
English footballers
Association football goalkeepers
Hong Kong First Division League players
Hong Kong Premier League players
Hong Kong FC players
English expatriate footballers
English expatriate sportspeople in Hong Kong
Expatriate footballers in Hong Kong